Tut-e Sofla (also Romanized as Tūt-e Soflá; also known as Māl-e Tīt and Māltīt) is a village in Sardasht Rural District, Sardasht District, Dezful County, Khuzestan Province, Iran. At the 2006 census, its population was 166, in 27 families.

References 

Populated places in Dezful County